2017 Aluminium alloy has copper, iron, magnesium, manganese and silicon as main alloying elements.

Chemical composition

Mechanical properties

Thermal properties

Aluminium alloy table

References 

Aluminium–copper alloys